The Kewaunee Pierhead lighthouse is a lighthouse located near Kewaunee in Kewaunee County, Wisconsin. The lighthouse looks nearly identical to the Holland Harbor Lighthouse, except that it is colored white.

History 
The original light marking the entrance to Kewaunee was established in 1889 on the North pier. In 1912, the current South pier was built as an open frame tower, with a fog signal building built behind it. The tower was equipped with a fifth order fresnel lens and the fog signal building supplied steam for a 10" fog whistle.

In 1919, the steam whistle was replaced by a compressed air Type F Diaphone fog horn. A 1972 recording of the fog horn was inducted into the National Recording Registry in the Library of Congress in 2005.

In 1931, the open frame tower was removed and a tower was built out of the roof of the fog signal building, giving the lighthouse the appearance it has now. The old open frame tower was later reconstructed as the Chicago Harbor Southeast Guidewall Lighthouse, where it still stands today.

The lighthouse was automated in 1981.  It was listed on the National Register of Historic Places in 2022.

Current Status 
The City of Kewaunee was granted ownership of the lighthouse in September 2011, as part of the National Historic Lighthouse Preservation Act (NHLPA). The Friends of the Kewaunee Pierhead Lighthouse was established as a 501(c)(3) non-profit organization and works to raise funds to restore the lighthouse.

The fresnel lens remained until June 5, 2019, when it was replaced with a Vega Industries VLB-44 LED light. The US Coast Guard maintains the light and the electronic fog horn.

The fresnel lens was moved and placed on display at the Kewaunee County History Center located at 217 Ellis St.

The lighthouse is in the process of being restored and is occasionally open for tours.

Gallery

References

Further reading

 Havighurst, Walter (1943) The Long Ships Passing: The Story of the Great Lakes, Macmillan Publishers.
 Oleszewski, Wes, Great Lakes Lighthouses, American and Canadian: A Comprehensive Directory/Guide to Great Lakes Lighthouses, (Gwinn, Michigan: Avery Color Studios, Inc., 1998) .
 
 Sapulski, Wayne S., (2001) Lighthouses of Lake Michigan: Past and Present (Paperback) (Fowlerville: Wilderness Adventure Books) ; .
 Wright, Larry and Wright, Patricia, Great Lakes Lighthouses Encyclopedia Hardback (Erin: Boston Mills Press, 2006) .

External links

Friends of the Kewaunee Pierhead Lighthouse
Aerial photographs of Kewaunee Pierhead Light at Marinas.com.
Terry Pepper, Seeing the light, Kewaunee Pier light.
Lighthouse Friends
NPS Inventory of Historic Light Stations - Wisconsin

Lighthouses completed in 1931
Buildings and structures in Kewaunee County, Wisconsin
Lighthouses in Wisconsin
Tourist attractions in Kewaunee County, Wisconsin
1931 establishments in Wisconsin
National Register of Historic Places in Kewaunee County, Wisconsin
Lighthouses on the National Register of Historic Places in Wisconsin